Zamora is a city and municipality of Spain located in the autonomous community of Castile and León. It is the capital of the province of Zamora. The city straddles the Duero river. With its 24 characteristic Romanesque style churches of the 12th and 13th centuries it has been called a "museum of Romanesque art". Zamora is the city with the most Romanesque churches in all of Europe. The most important celebration in Zamora is the Holy Week.

Zamora is part of the natural comarca of Tierra del Pan and it is the head of the judicial district of Zamora.

History
The city was founded early in the Bronze Age and was later occupied during the Iron Age by the Celtic people of the Vacceos who called it Ocalam.

After the Roman victory over the Lusitanian hero Viriathus the settlement was named by the Romans Occelum Durii or Ocellodurum (literally, "Eye of the Duero"). During Roman rule it was in the hands of the Vaccaei, and was incorporated into the Roman province of Hispania Tarraconensis. It was on the road from Emerita (modern Mérida) to Asturica Augusta (modern Astorga). (Ant. Itin. pp. 434, 439).

Two coins from the reign of the Visigothic king Sisebuto, show that it was known at the time as "Semure".

Following the campaigns of Musa ibn Nusayr in the 710s in the context of the Umayyad conquest of the Iberian Peninsula, the town was conquered and a Berber garrison was left in the there, but following the Arab-Berber strifes, the territory was reportedly seized by Alfonso I of Asturias. Not much attention was paid however to the place in the chronicles from this period, as Asturian human resources at the time were mostly targeted at the Cantabrian coast and little is known about the inhabitants of the Duero Valley.

A diocese and a bishop were established in the town in the early 10th century. Mozarab builders came from Toledo. The city became one of the most thriving Christian cities in Iberia in the early 10th century, possibly even passing León.

Zamora became the target of Ibn al-Qitt, who unsuccessfully tried to invade the city in 901 with help from  Berbers. It was also attacked several times during the Caliphal era, and Almanzor eventually seized the city in 966. The place returned to Christian control during the reign of Alfonso V of León.

Since the early 11th century, with the repopulation works by Raymond of Burgundy, the place saw planned repopulating efforts. A new perimeter of city walls was also erected in the 11th century. The population intramuros included the nobles and regal officers, the clergy, Frank settlers from Gascogne, Poitou and Provence who had installed in the city during the time of Raymond of Burgundy, settlers of Asturian, Leonese and Galician origin, as well as some Mozarabs. Zamora was granted a fuero in 1208.

The most notable historic episode in Zamora was the assassination outside the city walls of the king Sancho II of Castile in 1072. Some decades before, king Ferdinand I of León had divided his kingdoms between his three sons. To his daughter, Doña Urraca, he had bequeathed the "well fortified city of Zamora" (or "la bien cercada" in Spanish). All three sons warred among themselves, till the ultimate winner, Sancho, was left victorious. Zamora, under his sister who was allied with Leonese nobles, resisted. Sancho II of Castile, assisted by El Cid, laid siege to Zamora. King Sancho II was murdered by a duplicitous noble of Zamora, Bellido Dolfos, who tricked the king into a private meeting. After the death of Sancho, Castile reverted to his deposed brother Alfonso VI of León. The event was commemorated by the Portillo de la Traición (Treason Gate).

In the late middle ages, Zamora was one of the 17 cities (18 after the inclusion of Granada) that enjoyed a vote at the Cortes of Castile, actually speaking on behalf of all of Galicia since the early 15th century (Galicia did not have any city with representation until the 17th century).

Zamora was also the scene of fierce fighting in the 15th century, during the conflict between the supporters of Isabella the Catholic and Juana la Beltraneja. The Spanish proverb, No se ganó Zamora en una hora, literally, Zamora wasn't won in an hour, is a reference to these battles. It is the Spanish equivalent of the English proverb "Rome wasn't built in a day."

During the 12th century, the city was extraordinarily important for its strategic position in the wars between the Kingdom of León and the Almoravids and Almohads. As a result, the city preserves many churches and buildings from that time. In the 1140s and 1150s it was ruled by Prince Ponce Giraldo de Cabrera, who has a street named after him in the city today.

Henry IV granted Zamora the epithet of "most noble and most loyal city".

The city leaned towards support to the Revolt of the Comuneros in the northern hemisphere Fall of 1520. By September 1520, the corregidor appointed by the Crown was ousted and replaced by an alcalde designated by the community (a revolutionary development at the time). However, the hopes of the rebels across the Crown of Castile were handed a crushing blow at the Battle of Villalar on 23 April 1521.

In the Early Modern Period, the city lost its political and economic relevance and suffered emigration, especially to South America (where many other cities called Zamora were founded).

According to the Godoy Census, the city had a population of 10,171 in 1797.

During the Spanish Civil War (1936–1939), Zamora was from the start of the military rebellion a nationalist held city. The savagery of the repression against leftists and liberals is captured in Ramón Sender Barayón's 'A Death in Zamora', which tells of the extrajudicial murder of his mother, Amparo Barayon, the wife of the famous novelist Ramon Sender.

Geography

Location 

The municipality expands across a total area of 149.28 km2.

Climate 
Zamora has a cold semi-arid climate (Köppen: BSk), with cool winters and warm to hot summers. Precipitation is mainly recorded during two seasons, spring and autumn, with summer characterized by droughts. The highest temperature ever recorded is 41.0 °C (105 °F) on 24 July 1995 while the minimum stood at −13.4 °C (8 °F) on 16 January 1945. Fog is common during winters, frequently decreasing morning temperatures.

Main sights
Main sights of Zamora include:

Cathedral, in Romanesque style, dating to the 12th century, taking only 23 years to build.
 Medieval Castle of Zamora.
Palacio de los Condes de Alba y Aliste, built in 1459 by the first Count of Alva y Aliste. It boasts a patio and staircase decorated with carvings by artists from Lombardy.
 Calle Balborraz.
Church of San Pedro y San Ildefonso, built from the 11th century, probably over a Visigothic temple. It was reformed in Romanesque style in the 12th–13th centuries, but was much renovated in the 15th and 18th centuries. It has presently a single nave with cross vaults
Church of Santa María Magdalena. The southern façade is in Romanesque style, dating back to the 13th century.
 Church of San Isidoro (12th century). It has one nave, having a square major chapel. The exterior features two ogival arcades with archivolts.
 Church of San Claudio de Olivares, known from the 12th century. Of small size, it has a single nave with a presbytery and a semicircular apse. The columns of the nave have carvings.
 Church of San Juan de Puerta Nueva (12th century stained glass circular window, symbol of Zamora).
 Church of Santa María la Nueva (12th century, baptistery dating back to the 13th century).
 Church of Santiago de los Caballeros (11th century), located outside the city walls. El Cid was created knight here.
 Church of Santiago El Burgo (Southern façade, 12th century Romanesque)
 City walls: three walled enclosures dating back to the 11th, 12th and 13th centuries.
 Museo de Semana Santa de Zamora: Opposite the Church of Santa María la Nueva, dedicated to Semana Santa de Zamora the processions during which are celebrated with particular ceremony in Zamora. The museum holds a large collection of pasos, the figures which are carried in procession through the streets by various 'cofradías' or brotherhoods. See Holy Week in Zamora
 Museo de Zamora: Local history museum with an archeological collection and chronological displays ranging from prehistoric inhabitants of the region to Roman and modern models.

Surroundings
 Arcenillas church (15th century panels)
 Hiniesta church (Gothic, sculptures and murals)
 The Church of San Pedro de la Nave, (village of El Campillo – 12 km, 7½ miles distant) was founded in the 7th century, rebuilt in the 12th century, and is one of the three best-preserved Visigothic churches in all of Spain. It was moved stone by stone and then re-erected, owing to the construction of a reservoir on its original site.

Transportation 
The city is served by the Zamora Railway Station, located on one of the Spanish North-Northwestern high speed lines.  All major Spanish bus companies and some local companies operate out of the Estación de Autobuses de Zamora, which connects Zamora to neighboring cities, such as Salamanca and Benavente, as well as nearby pueblos, major cities such as Valladolid and Madrid, and further destinations around Spain and Europe.

Food

Food specialties in Zamora include the pulses, the chickpeas or 'garbanzos' from Fuentesauco, the exquisite cheese made from sheep's milk, honey from Sanabria, asparagus from Guareña, peppers from Benavente, steak from Aliste, mushrooms, game, cold meats, cakes and sweets.

Other specialties are the rice dishes from Zamora and the Toro wines (very dark, almost black, nowadays made using modern techniques – with a rapidly growing reputation for their taste and quality).
Traditional dishes include bacalao a la tranca (a cod dish), pulpo a la sanabresa (an octopus dish), dos y pingada (two fried eggs with fried ham, usually served at Easter) and presas de ternera (a beef dish). For dessert there is the rebojo Zamorano, a very tasty though hard type of bun, and las natillas almendradas (Spanish style custard with almonds).

Notable locals

Predilect sons and daughters (honorary citizens)
 Ángel Nieto (1947–2017; posthumous recognition).

Sister cities
  Bragança, Portugal (1984).
  Oviedo, Spain, since 2001.
  Yaritagua, Venezuela.
  Altagracia de Orituco, Venezuela

References
Citations

Bibliography

External links

Tourism in Zamora
Zamora travel guide

 
Municipalities of the Province of Zamora
Roman sites in Spain